Wooding is a surname. Notable people with the surname include:

 Chris Wooding (born 1977), British writer
 John Wooding (1857–1931), American politician
 Lisa Wooding (born 1979), English field-hockey player
 Norman Wooding (1927–2005), British industrialist
 Sam Wooding (1895–1985), expatriate American jazz pianist, arranger and bandleader